This list includes notable alumni, faculty, and staff of what is now the University of Northern Iowa.

Alumni

Notable faculty

References

 
University of Northern Iowa people